Daulnay is a Canadian community in Gloucester County, New Brunswick. It is part of the local service district of Allardville, which includes several other communities.

History

The settlement was named after the 17th century Charles de Menou d'Aulnay, a leader of the French colonization of Canada.

Notable people

See also
List of communities in New Brunswick

References

Communities in Gloucester County, New Brunswick